Bhadeya is a underdeveloped country side locality in Gaya district of Bihar, India. Bhadeya is located in Barachati, Gaya, in the state of Bihar in northern India. Bhadeya includes Bhadeya, Karma and its localities of Azizabad, Karimgunj, Razagunj, Ansar Nagar, Zahoorabad. It also comprises Sondiha, Paili, Chhaura Bandh, Bigha, Imamgunj, Gaiwal Karma, Hasanpur, Mananbigha.

Location
Bhadeya is at 24.78 north and 84.98 east. It is close to the Gulsakari river. National Highway 2 and Oldham Road (the old road from Gaya to Chota Nagpur) pass through Bhadeya.

Inhabitants
Pathans are the ethnic majority. Beyond farming and local transport services people work in the states of the Persian Gulf, providing the area with an important source of income.

Climate
Bhadeya has a tropical climate. Summers are generally hot (April–June), while winters are cool (October–February). It experiences southwestern monsoon rains from July to September.

Education 
Bhadeya has schools, Library and tuition centers serving rural south Bihar including:

Madarsatul Uloom , Paily , Bhadeya 824220 
Sir Syed memorial school 
Sansons World School
 Azad Academy
 Urdu middle school, Bhadeya (Now Upgraded to 10+2)

 Mushtaq Ali Khan Minority High School
 Madarsa Amjadia,
 Bhadeya Public Library, founded by Bhadeya social welfare trust. http://bswt.in/

Religion
The majority of population is Sunni Muslim. Bhadeya has five mosques: Bhadeya Jama Masjid, Bigha Par ki Masjid, Masjid Ali Azizabad, Masjid aziz and one at Kata Par. one more mosques are under construction in Shamshuddin Nagar.

Notable individual
  
Janab Hassan Raza Khan
Mohammad Aftab Uddin Khan 
Babu Mushtaque Ali Khan 
Janab Alauddin Khan (Manager Sahab) 
Janab Kamal Uddin Khan
Prince Nasim Khan
Janab Ozair khan
Aladdin Khan

References

Villages in Gaya district